Dick Sutherland (born Archibald Thomas Johnson, December 23, 1881 – February 3, 1934) was an American film actor, active mostly during the silent film era. Born in Benton, Kentucky, in 1881, Sutherland appeared in more than 70 films between 1921 and 1932. Sutherland died at his home in Hollywood, California, from a heart attack, at the age of 52. He was survived by his wife, Verba, and three sons, Harry, Everett, and Lester.  He is interred at Inglewood Park Cemetery. His distinctive facial features were a result of acromegaly.

Partial filmography

 The Foolish Matrons (1921)
 A Sailor-Made Man (1921)
 The Magnificent Brute (1921)
 Rags to Riches (1922)
 Grandma's Boy (1922)
 The Deuce of Spades (1922)
 The Phantom Fortune (1923)
 Masters of Men (1923)
 His Last Race (1923)
 Battling Mason (1924)
 The Red Lily (1924)
 Men (1924)
 The Dangerous Blonde (1924)
 The Tornado (1924)
 The Mask of Lopez (1924)
 Defying the Law (1924)
 Excuse Me (1925)
 Jimmie's Millions (1925)
 With This Ring (1925)
 Zander the Great (1925)
 The Fighting Demon (1925)
 Spook Ranch (1925)
 The Fighting Dude (1925)
 The Flying Fool (1925)
 Don Juan (1926)
 Broken Hearts of Hollywood (1926)
 Twinkletoes (1926)
 The Jazz Girl (1926)
 When a Man Loves (1927)
 The Beloved Rogue (1927)
 Uncle Tom's Cabin (1927)
 The Battle of the Century (1927)
 The Viking (1928)
 The Hoose-Gow (1929)
 Wild Orchids (1929)
 Chandu the Magician (1932)

References

External links

 

1881 births
1934 deaths
Male actors from Kentucky
American male film actors
American male silent film actors
People with acromegaly
People from Benton, Kentucky
Burials at Inglewood Park Cemetery
20th-century American male actors